Satkhira City College is a college in the Rasulpur neighborhood of Satkhira, Bangladesh. It offers bachelor's degrees and master's degrees. It also has Higher Secondary School Certificate (HSC) program. It was established in 1980. Currently Abu Ahmed is the principal and Md. Shahidul Islam is the vice principal of the college.

Educational activities 
        HSC			
        Degree(Pass)			
        Honours		
        Master's Preliminary			
        Master's Final
        Masters 1 part

Available courses

Degree (pass) 

         Bachelor of Arts (B.A)
         Bachelor of Social Science (B.S.S) 
         Bachelor of Business Studies (B.B.S)

Honours 

         Bengaladeshi 
         Historya
         Islamic History & Culture
         Philosophy
         Islamic Studies
         Political Science
         Sociology
         Social Welfare
         Economics
         Marketing
         Accounting
         Management
         Geography & Environment
         Finance

Master's  

         ''''''Sociology 
         Accounting

References

Universities and colleges in Bangladesh
Educational institutions of Khulna Division